The George A. Strong House is a historic building located at 1030 Central Avenue in the city of Plainfield in Union County, New Jersey. Built in 1896, it was added to the National Register of Historic Places on August 28, 2012, for its significance in architecture, education, and community planning and development. The duCret School of Art purchased the building in 1977 to use for art education.

See also
National Register of Historic Places listings in Union County, New Jersey

References

External links
 

Plainfield, New Jersey	
Houses in Union County, New Jersey
Colonial Revival architecture in New Jersey
National Register of Historic Places in Union County, New Jersey
Houses on the National Register of Historic Places in New Jersey
Houses completed in 1896
New Jersey Register of Historic Places